Mottalciata is a comune (municipality) in the Province of Biella in the Italian region Piedmont, located about  northeast of Turin and about  southeast of Biella.

Mottalciata borders the following municipalities: Benna, Buronzo, Castelletto Cervo, Cossato, Gifflenga, Lessona, Massazza, Villanova Biellese.

Demographic evolution

References

Cities and towns in Piedmont